Organization of Japanese forces in the South-East Asian theatre of World War II.

Southern Army Command (Indochina HQ)

Hisaichi Terauchi, Commander of Southern Army
Seiichi Aoki, Assistant Chief of Staff Southern Army
Kitsuju Ayabe, Vice Chief of Staff Southern Army
Masazumi Inada, Vice Chief of Staff Southern Army
Jo Iimura, Chief of Staff Southern Army

Japanese Forces in Hong-Kong

Takeo Ito: Commanding Officer Infantry Group 38th Division, Hong Kong
Rensuke Isogai: Governor-General of Hong Kong
Major-General Ichiki: Head Secretariat to Governor-General of Hong Kong
Juro Adachi: General Officer Commanding Hong Kong Defence Force
Major-General Arisue: Chief of Staff 23rd Army, China-Hong Kong

Conformation of Indochina Army Garrison

Commanders-in-Chief Indochina Army Garrison
Yuitsu Tsuchihashi:- Commanding General, Indo-China Garrison Army
Hisaichi Terauchi:- Commander-in-Chief, Southern Army, Field Marshal; formally surrendered his command, Saigon, was moved to Malaya, died at his quarters, Johore Bahru, of cerebral hemorrhage

Chief of Staff Indochina Army Garrison
Shinichi Tanaka:- Chief of Staff, Inspectorate General, LOC; inspection tour, French Indo-China, LtGen, inspection tours of French Indo-China, Thailand, Malaya, Philippines

Staff officers, Indochina Army Garrison
Masutaro Nakai:- Staff Officer, French Indo-China Expeditionary Army

Commander of Transportation regiment Imperial Guards, Indochina detachment
Nobuyoshi Obata:- Commanding Officer, Transportation Regiment, Imperial Guard Division, (Tokyo; French Indo-China; Malaya; Sumatra)

Commanders of Regular Armies, Indochina Army Garrison
Yuitsu Tsuchihashi:- Commanding General, Thirty-eighth Army (Indo-China)
Lieutenant-General Chijisima: Governor-General of Indo-China
Shōjirō Iida: General Officer Commanding 25th Army, Indo-China

Unit in Indochina
11th Base Unit (Saigon)
Fifteenth Army Detachment
Imperial Guard Division in South French Indo-China
55th Division headquarters were in French Indo-China

Air Squadrons in Indochina area
Japanese Navy units:
Genzan Air Group
Mihoro Air Group
Japanese Army units:
64th Sentai
3rd Sentai:- about 430 planes, In South French Indo-China
Kiyotake Kawaguchi, command the Kawaguchi Expeditionary Detachment struck at British Borneo.
Utata Fukunaga : Commanding Officer 16th Field Transport Command, Malaya
Lieutenant-General Inoue: General Officer Commanding 94th Division, Malaya
Teizo Ishiguro Led the Twenty-ninth Army (with 94th Division, etc.): Malay Peninsula

Structures of Japanese forces in Penang Region
Masakichi Itami: Governor-General of Penang Region

Organization of Japanese forces in Philippines

Operative Commanders in Philippine Campaign
Masaharu Homma:- Fourteenth Army Commander, (Philippines Campaign)
Kenzo Kitano:- 4th Division Commander, from Shanghai to Philippines campaign
Makino Shiro:- 16th Division Commander (Leyte)
Sōsaku Suzuki:- Thirty-fifth Army Commander (Central and Southern Philippines), killed in action
Yuitsu Tsuchihashi:- 48th Division Commander (Philippines operation)
Tadasu Kataoka:- 1st Division Chief
Tsuyuo Yamagata:- 26th Division Commander
Shigenori Kuroda:- Fourteenth Army Commander
Shinpei Fukuei:- led the 102nd Division
Shizuo Yokoyama:- led the 8th Division (Shinbu Group)
Rikichi Tsukada:- command the 10th Division and 1st Raiding Group (Kembu Group)
Fourteenth Area Army (Shobu Group)
Tomoyuki Yamashita:- Twenty-fifth Army Commander, (took Singapore, conquered Bataan and Corregidor), also Fourteenth Area Army Commander, arrived Manila, directed Philippines Campaign, surrendered, Baguio

Commanding Generals of Army Units in the Philippines
Yoshiharu Iwanaka: General Officer Commanding 2nd Armored Division, Philippines
Torao Ikuta: Commandant Manila Garrison
Masaharu Homma General Officer Commanding 14th Army, Philippines
Takichi Hōjō: Commanding Officer 54th Independent Mixed Brigade, Philippines
Lieutenant-General Igatu: General Officer Commanding Prisoner of War Camps Philippines
Masatsugu Araki: Commanding Officer 79th Brigade, Philippines
Isamu Chō: Southern Army Liaison Officer to 14th Army, Philippines
Shinpei Fukei: General Officer Commanding 102nd Division, Philippines and General Officer Commanding 102nd Division, Philippines
Jiro Harada: General Officer Commanding 10th Division and General Officer Commanding 100th Division, Philippines
Yoshihide Hayashi: Director-General of Military Administration Philippines

Commanders of Army Air Force, during Philippines Campaign
Kioji Tominaga:- Fourth Air Army Commander; arrived Manila—engaged in Philippines Campaign

Commanders of Japanese Army Airborne units, Philippines Campaign
Rikishi Tsukada:- Commanding General, 1st Airborne Raiding Group, moved to Luzon-participated in battle for Clark Field

Units in Philippines
31st Special Base Unit (Manila)
32nd Special Base Unit (Davao)
33rd Special Base Unit (Cebu)
18th Division (Leyte Island)
102d Division (Visayas)
100th Division Davao (Mindanao)
30th Division Cagayan (Mindanao)
54th Independent Mixed Brigade Zamboanga (Mindanao)
55th Independent Mixed Brigade (Jolo Island)
4th Tank Regiment - Lieut. Colonel Kumagaya
7th Tank Regiment - Colonel Sonoda
7th Independent Tank Company - Captain Kono
1st Independent Tank Company - Captain Uchida
2nd Independent Tank Company - Captain Kurobe
Itoh SNLF Tank Company - Major Itoh
2nd Tank Division - Lieut. General Iwanaka
8th Independent Tank Company - 1st Lt. Matsumoto
9th Independent Tank Company - 1st Lt. Nakajima
Iwashita Independent Tank Company - Captain Iwashita
Sumi Independent SP Gun Company - Captain Sumi
3rd Tank Brigade - Brigadier General Shigemi
6th Tank Regiment - Colonel Ida
10th Tank Regiment - Colonel Harada
4th Tank Brigade
11th Tank Regiment

Air Squadrons in Philippines
Japanese Navy
First Air Fleet
Tainan Air Group
Takao Air Group
204th Air Group
1st Air Group
Japanese Army
 Fourth Air Army
11th Air Fleet
2nd Sentai
14th Sentai
30th Sentai
Tachikawa Air Unit (technical evaluations on captured equipment)
4th Air Division
7th Air Division
2d Air Division

Organization of Japanese units in Singapore

Commander in Chief, Seventh Area Army
Seishirō Itagaki, Commander in Chief, Seventh Area Army (Singapore)

Deputy Chief of Staff, Singapore Units
Kitsuju Ayabe:- Deputy Chief of Staff, Southern Army (Singapore)

Officers attached to Seventh Area Army HQ
Kitsuju Ayabe:- assigned to Seventh Area Army Headquarters (Singapore)

Chief of Staff, Seventh Area Army
Kitsuju Ayabe:- Chief of Staff, Seventh Area Army, till end of War

Chiefs of Unit 9420, Singapore
Rioichi Naito:- founder of Oka Unit (Unit 9420)
Masataka Kitagawa:- Commander of Unit 9420

Commanders of regular Armies, Malay Peninsula
Twenty-ninth Army Commander, Teizo Ishiguro
94th Division, Commander Teizo Ishiguro (HQ in Malay Peninsula)
Satoshi Kinoshita (木下敏 中将): Commander of Third Air Army was assigned to Singapore, where it controlled the 5th, 7th, and 9th Air Divisions, etc.
Major-General Arimina: Commandant Changi Jail, Singapore
Kitsuju Ayabe: Chief of Staff 7th Area Army, Singapore
Shinpei Fukei: Commandant Prisoner of War Camps, Singapore
Kenji Doihara: Commander in Chief 7th Area Army, Singapore
Masazumi Inada: Commanding Officer 3rd Shipping Transport Command, Singapore
Kiyotake Kawaguchi, commanded the Kawaguchi Expeditionary Detachment striking at British Borneo.
Utata Fukunaga: Commanding Officer 16th Field Transport Command, Malaya
Lieutenant-General Inoue: General Officer Commanding 94th Division, Malaya
Teizo Ishiguro: Led the Twenty-ninth Army (with 94th Division, etc.): Malay Peninsula

Structures of Japanese forces in Penang Region
Masakichi Itami: Governor-General of Penang Region

Operative units in Malaya area
1st Tank Regiment - Colonel Mukaida
6th Tank Regiment - Colonel Kawamura
14th Tank Regiment - Colonel Kita

Chiefs of Regular Armies, Singapore Campaign
Tomoyuki Yamashita:- Twenty-fifth Army Commander, (took Singapore, conquered Bataan and Corregidor)

Japanese Units in Singapore, Andaman and Malaya
10th Special Base Unit (Singapore)
12th Special Base Unit (Andaman)
15th Base Unit (Penang)
Seventh Area Army (Singapore) - Kenji Doihara
Sixteenth Army
Twenty-fifth Army
Twenty-ninth Army

Japanese Army organization in Andaman/Nicobar Islands
Yoshisuke Inoue: Commanding Officer 35th Independent Mixed Brigade, Andaman Islands
Major-General Saburo Isoda: Japanese Liaison Officer to Indian National Army
Toshio Itsuki: Commanding Officer 36th Independent Mixed Brigade, Nicobar Islands
Hideo Iwakuro: Japanese Liaison Officer to Indian National Army

Japanese Air Force Commanders in Singapore
Satoshi Kinoshita (木下敏 中将):- Chief of Third Air Army] (HQ in Singapore)

Air Units in Malaya, Singapore
Japanese Navy
Kanoya Air Group
Genzan Air Group
22nd Koku Sentai
Japanese Army
Tachikawa Air Unit (technical evaluations on captured equipment)
5th Air Division
7th Air Division
9th Air Division

Organization of Burmese Army Detachment

Commanders-in-Chief, Burma Area Army
Masakazu Kawabe:- Commanding General, Burma Area Army
Heitarō Kimura:- Commanding General, Burma Area Army

Chief of Staff, Burma Area Army
Shinichi Tanaka:- Chief of Staff, Burma Area Army

Commanders in regular Armies, Burma Area
Shinichi Tanaka:- 18th Division Commander (Burma)
Masakazu Kawabe led the (Burma Area Army)
Shozo Sakurai Commanded the Twenty-eighth Army
Kōtoku Satō command the 31st Division
Yuzo Matsuyama 56th Division, commanded by Lieutenant General
Masabumi Yamauchi led the 15th Division
Renya Mutaguchi, who had command of the Fifteenth Army
Hideo Iwakuro: Chief of Staff 55th Division, Burma  and Chief of Staff 28th Army, Burma
Takeakira Isomura: Deputy Chief of Staff Burma Area Army, Burma
Haruki Isayama, : Chief of Staff 15th Army, Burma
Shōjirō Iida: General Officer Commanding 15th Army, Thailand-Burma
Masaki Honda: General Officer Commanding 33rd Army, Burma
Jiro Ichida : Vice Chief of Staff Burma Area Army
Tuyoji Hirano,: Commanding Officer Kempeitai 25th Army, Sumatra
Toshiji Aida : Commanding Officer Infantry Group 18th Division, Burma
Iwaichi Fujiwara: Chief of Intelligence 15th Army, Burma
Tadashi Hanaya: General Officer Commanding 55th Division, Burma
Yoshihide Hayashi: Commanding Officer 24th Independent Mixed Brigade, Burma and General Officer Commanding 53rd Division, Burma

Operative units in Burma
1st Company/2nd Tank Regiment - First Lieut. Okada
14th Tank Regiment - Lieut.Colonel Ueda

Air Units in Burma
Japanese Army units:
81st Sentai
Japanese Navy units
Kanoya Air Group
Yamada Air Group
Toko Air Group
Seaplane tender Sagara Maru
22nd Koku Sentai

Japanese Units in Thailand

Eighteenth Area Army Commander
Aketo Nakamura:- Eighteenth Area Army Commander
Shihachi Katamura:- Fifteenth Army Commander
Aketo Nakamura: Led The Eighteenth Area Army, was stationed in Thailand
Masachika Hirata: General Officer Commanding 22nd Division, Thailand
Tadashi Hanaya: Chief of Staff 18th Area Army, Thailand
Shōjirō Iida: General Officer Commanding 15th Army, Thailand
Katsumi Adachi: General Officer Commanding 4th Special Railway Corps, Thailand
Hitoshi Hamada: Chief of Staff 39th Army, Thailand: Deputy Chief of Staff 18th Area Army, Thailand and Second Superintendent of Railways, Thailand

Conformation of Japanese forces in the Dutch East Indies

Commanders in Japanese forces detachment, Dutch East Indies
Kenzo Kitano:- Nineteenth Army Commander (Headquarters: Amboina)
Yuichiro Nagano:- Commander Sixteenth Army and 48th Division (Headquarters: Java)
Moritake Tanabe:- Twenty-fifth Army and the Imperial Guard Division unit (Headquarters: Sumatra)
Fusataro Teshima:- Second Army Commander with leading of 5th, 32nd, 35th, and 36th Divisions comprised the heart of this army.

Commanders in Regular Armies, Dutch East Indies Campaign
Kiyotake Kawaguchi:- Brigade Commander, 35th Infantry Brigade (MajGen), after outbreak of Pacific war, participated in Borneo invasion.
Shizuo Sakaguchi: Commanded the Sakaguchi Detachment built around three infantry battalions detached on the eastern coast of Borneo.
Moritake Tanabe: Commanding Twenty-fifth Army (with the Imperial Guard Division, etc.) Sumatra area.
Hitoshi Imamura: Commanding 16th Army, Java, then 8th Area Army (responsible for 17th Army in the Solomons and 18th Army in New Guinea)
Yuichiro Nagano: Commanding 16th Army, Java
Kumachiki Hada: Commanding 16th Army, Java
Major-General Akashi: Commanding Officer 56th Independent Mixed Brigade, Borneo
Masao Baba General Officer Commanding 4th Division, Sumatra and General Officer Commanding 37th Army, Borneo
Shinichi Endo: Commanding Officer 57th Independent Mixed Brigade, Celebes
Major-General Ishiri: Commander in Moluccas Area
Takeo Itō: Commanding Officer 40th Independent Mixed Brigade, New Ireland Island from 8 July 1944
Shigeo Iwabe: Commanding Officer 28th Independent Mixed Brigade, Java
Jo Iimura: Commander in Chief 2nd Area Army, Celebes

Units in the Dutch East Indies
21st Special Base Unit (Surabaya)
22nd Special Base Unit (Balikpapan)
23rd Special Base Unit (Makassar)
25th Special Base Unit (Ambon)
Second Area Army (in the Celebes)
Thirty-seventh Army (in South Borneo) - Masao Baba
4th Tank Regiment - Lieut.Colonel Kumagaya
2nd Tank Regiment - Colonel Mori

Units in Halmahera island (Dutch East Indies) 
Imperial Army detachment
32nd Division-Lieutenant-General Yoshiho Ishii
128th Independent Mixed Brigade
Imperial Navy detachment
26th Special Base Force - Vice-Admiral Shinichi Ichinose. (It was disbanded in the late World War II)

Japanese Air Units in the Dutch East Indies
Japanese Navy
Genzan Air Group
Tainan Air Group
934th Air Fleet
36th Air Fleet

References
 

Military history of Japan during World War II
World War II orders of battle